Nagorao Ghanashyam Deshpande (Devanagari: नागोराव घनश्याम देशपांडे) (1909–2000) was a Marathi poet from Maharashtra, India.

He was born on 21 August 1909  in the town of Shendurjan in Buldhana District of Maharashtra. He died on 10 May 2000.

He lived most of his life in the town of Mehkar, also in Buldhana District. Because of his premature birth, he suffered considerable sickness through much of his life of 91 years. His brother (V G Deshpande) and cousin (Sumati Suklikar) were politicians with Bharatiya Jana Sangh. Poet Deshpande's poems have been set to music, mainly by singer-composer G N Joshi.

Deshpande received in 1986 a Sahitya Akademi Award for his collection of poems Khoon Gathi (खूणगाठी).

The following are the titles of the five collections of his poems:
Sheel (शीळ) (1954)
Abhisar (अभिसार) (1963)
Khoon Gathi (खूणगाठी) (1985)
Gumphan (गुंफण) (1996)
Kanchanicha Mahal (कंचनीचा महाल)  (1996)

References

Marathi-language writers
People from Buldhana district
1909 births
2000 deaths
Recipients of the Sahitya Akademi Award in Marathi
20th-century Indian poets
Indian male poets
Poets from Maharashtra
20th-century Indian male writers